Sanguirana luzonensis, also known as the Luzon frog, is a species of true frog, family Ranidae. It is endemic to the island of Luzon (including some associated islands), the Philippines. It is very common in many habitats, although it is suspected to be declining because of habitat loss and deterioration.

References

luzonensis
Amphibians of the Philippines
Endemic fauna of the Philippines
Fauna of Luzon
Amphibians described in 1896
Taxa named by George Albert Boulenger